The People's Socialist Republic of Albania established post-war diplomatic ties with the Federal Republic of Germany for the first time on September 15, 1987. Both countries would exchange ambassadors on October 2nd of that same year. Three weeks later, on October 23, 1987 the german minister of foreign affairs Hans-Dietrich Genscher paid an official six-day visit to Albania.

List of diplomatic representatives of Albania to Germany (1987–present)

Notes

References 

 
Germany
Albania